Bilge Zobu (born 7 September 1932) is a Turkish actor. He appeared in more than thirty films since 1958.

Selected filmography

References

External links 

1932 births
Living people
Turkish male film actors